A party bus (also known as a party ride, limo bus, limousine bus, party van, or luxury bus) is a large motor vehicle usually derived from a conventional bus or coach, but modified and designed to carry 10 or more people for recreational purposes. Party buses can often include music systems, on board bars and dancing poles. The basis for interior design of partybuses are usually lighting effects based on modern LED panels and lasers as well as specially designed, comfortable, most often leather chairs and a professional dance floor. The first vehicles of this type appeared in San Francisco and were quickly popularized in the United States and around the world.
Party buses are a type of vehicle that has become increasingly popular in recent years for hosting parties and events on the go. These buses are typically modified or customized to include amenities such as sound systems, disco lights, and even dance floors, making them a popular choice for bachelor/bachelorette parties, proms, and other special occasions.

History
The history of party buses can be traced back to the 1960s and 70s when rock bands started using converted school buses to transport their equipment and entourage on tour. These buses were eventually modified to include living quarters and other amenities, and some even became famous as symbols of the rock and roll lifestyle. In the 1980s, limousine companies started offering party buses as an alternative to traditional limousines, and the trend continued to grow throughout the 90s and early 2000s.

Party buses today
Today, party buses are a common sight on the streets of major cities, and many companies specialize in providing these services for a wide range of events and occasions. Party buses can accommodate groups of various sizes, and many offer amenities such as TVs, bars, and even karaoke machines. In addition to traditional events, such as weddings and proms, party buses are also popular for corporate events and team-building activities.

Statistics
According to industry reports, the party bus rental market is projected to grow at a CAGR of around 5.72% from 2021 to 2028. The growth is attributed to factors such as rising disposable incomes, increasing demand for luxury travel, and the popularity of social media platforms, which promote the use of party buses for sharing experiences with friends and followers.

See also 

 Customised buses
 Limousine
 List of buses
 Vehicle for hire

References 

Buses by type
Vehicles for hire
Bus, party